Cushenbury, California is an unincorporated place in San Bernardino County, California.  It is located at the end of the Burlington Northern Santa Fe's Cushenbury Branch, and is 9 miles southeast of Lucerne Valley.  The settlement is the site of a cement plant, opened by Kaiser Steel in 1957 and today run by the Mitsubishi Corporation.  It lends its name to the Cushenbury milkvetch, the common name of Astragalus albens.

References

Unincorporated communities in San Bernardino County, California
Unincorporated communities in California